Percichthys melanops is a species of temperate perch endemic to Chile, where it occurs in pre-Andean streams.  This species can reach   TL.

References

Percichthyidae
Fish of Chile
Taxonomy articles created by Polbot
Fish described in 1855
Endemic fauna of Chile